Bahana is a 1960 Indian Hindi-language film starring Meena Kumari, Mehmood and Sajjan in lead roles. The film was directed by actor-director M. Kumar and was produced by Pramila under the banner of Silver Films.

Cast
 Meena Kumari
 Sajjan
 Mehmood Ali
 Sulochana Latkar
 Krishna Kumari
 Helen

Crew
 Director – M. Kumar
 Producer – Pramila, Ram Kumar	
 Music – Madan Mohan
 Lyrics – Rajendra Krishan
 Playback Singers – Shamshad Begum, Lata Mangeshkar, Asha Bhosle, Talat Mahmood

Soundtrack
The film had eight songs in it. The music of the film was composed by Madan Mohan. Rajendra Krishan penned down the lyrics.

References

1960s Hindi-language films